Abdulla Abduwal (born 8 September 1999) is a Chinese footballer currently playing as a forward for Xinjiang Tianshan Leopard.

Career statistics

Club
.

References

1999 births
Living people
Chinese footballers
Association football forwards
China League One players
Xinjiang Tianshan Leopard F.C. players